David Cox may refer to:

David A. Cox (born 1948), American mathematician
David Cox (artist) (1783–1859), British landscapist
David Cox (Australian politician) (born 1954), Australian federal politician
David Cox (footballer) (born 1989), Scottish footballer
David Cox (gymnast) (born 1970), British Olympic gymnast
David Cox (Marine) (1966–1994), U.S. Marine found killed by an unknown assailant
David Cox (statistician) (1924–2022), English statistician
David Cox (1960s cricketer) (born 1946), British cricketer, played for Somerset
David Cox (1990s cricketer) (born 1972), British cricketer, played for Durham
David Cox (Scottish cricketer) (born 1973), Scottish cricketer
David Cox Jr. (1809–1885), British landscapist
David Cox (composer) (1916–1997), British composer
David Cox (basketball) (born 1973), American college basketball coach
David Cox, musician of London-based duo AutoKratz
Dave Cox (1938–2010), American politician